Group 9 of the 2017 UEFA European Under-21 Championship qualifying competition consisted of five teams: England, Switzerland, Norway, Bosnia and Herzegovina, and Kazakhstan. The composition of the nine groups in the qualifying group stage was decided by the draw held on 5 February 2015.

The group was played in home-and-away round-robin format. The group winners qualified directly for the final tournament, while the runners-up advanced to the play-offs if they were one of the four best runners-up among all nine groups (not counting results against the sixth-placed team).

Standings

Matches
Times are CEST (UTC+2) for dates between 29 March and 24 October 2015 and between 27 March and 29 October 2016, for other dates times are CET (UTC+1).

Goalscorers
4 goals

 Mohamed Elyounoussi
 Shani Tarashaj

3 goals

 Chuba Akpom
 Marcus Rashford
 Ghayas Zahid

2 goals

 Tammy Abraham
 Ruben Loftus-Cheek
 James Ward-Prowse
 Duncan Watmore
 Martin Ødegaard
 Edimilson Fernandes
 Haris Tabaković

1 goal

 Armin Ćerimagić
 Haris Hajradinović
 Lewis Baker
 Nathaniel Chalobah
 Demarai Gray
 Josh Onomah
 Nathan Redmond
 John Swift
 Abat Aimbetov
 Miras Tuliyev
 Didar Zhalmukan
 Fredrik Aursnes
 Alexander Sørloth
 Anders Trondsen
 Martin Angha
 Florian Kamberi
 Salim Khelifi

References

External links
Standings and fixtures at UEFA.com

Group 9